TT Zero – an electric motorsport event introduced for the 2010 Isle of Man TT races – replaced the similar TTXGP race as a 1-lap (37.733 miles) circuit of the Snaefell Mountain Course. The TT Zero event as an officially sanctioned Isle of Man TT race is for racing motorcycles where "The technical concept is for motorcycles (two wheeled) to be powered without the use of carbon based fuels and have zero toxic/noxious emissions." The Isle of Man Government offered a prize of £10,000 for the first entrant to exceed the prestigious 100 mph (22 minutes and 38.388 seconds) average speed around the Mountain Course.

The inaugural 2010 TT Zero race was won by Mark Miller riding a MotoCzysz E1pc motor-cycle in 23 minutes and 22.89 seconds at an average race speed of 96.820 mph for 1 lap (37.733 miles) of the Mountain Course and the first United States winner since Dave Roper won the 1984 Historic TT riding a 500 cc Matchless G50. The TT Zero race replaced the 2009 TTXGP franchise, won by Rob Barber riding a Team AGNI motor-cycle in 25 minutes and 53.5 seconds at an average race speed of 87.434 mph for 1 lap (37.733 miles), with the simplification of the regulations and the emphasis on electric powered motor-cycles. The MotoCzysz E1pc was also the first American manufactured motor-cycle to win an Isle of Man TT Race since Oliver Godfrey won the 1911 Senior TT with an Indian V-Twin motor-cycle. The 2010 TT Zero race also produced the return of semi-dustbin fairing permissible under the TT Zero regulations and adopted by some entrants, but banned by the FIM since 1958 for racing motor-cycles. 

After taking their first victory in 2014 Team Mugen from Japan have been the dominant force winning the event for 6 consecutive years from 2014-2019 and raising the average lap speed to 121.9mph.

In 2019, a moratorium on further events in this class was announced, due to the slow take-up in electric motorcycles and few race participants. Speaking in late 2021 about the future of the event, Enterprise Minister Alex Allinson has ruled out further competition in this class until at least 2024.

Eligibility

Entrants
 Entrants must be in possession of a valid National Entrants or FIM Sponsors Licence for Road Racing.
 All motor-cycles must comply with Appendix D of the ACU National Sporting Code Group A1 for solos.

Machines
Description
 Prototype electrically propelled motor-cycles. Powered solely by stored electricity (battery/accumulator)

Weight
Motor-cycles minimum weight is 100 kg and up to 300 kg. Weighed in race ready mode.

Accumulator (storage battery)
The accumulator is defined as any equipment used for the intermediate storage of electrical energy supplied by the solar generator or by the charging unit. Any on-board accumulator is considered as an integral part of the vehicle’s accumulator. All on-board electrical equipment, unless consisting of items originally powered by dry batteries, small accumulator or their own solar cells, must receive its energy supply from the vehicle’s official accumulator.

Voltage
 The voltage is limited to 800 volts between two points.

Kinetic Energy Recovery Systems
 It is permitted to recover energy generated by the kinetic energy of the vehicle using a Regenerative brake or Kinetic Energy Recovery Systems (KERS).

Aerodynamic aids and Streamlining.
 The competitor must be completely visible from either side, except for the riders hands and forearms which may be obscured by bodywork.
 Bodywork in front of the rider must not be higher than the competitor's shoulders.

Official Qualification Time
 30.00 minutes at an average race speed of 75.46 mph for 1 lap of the Isle of Man TT Mountain Course without stopping.

TT Zero Race Results

2010 TT Zero Race
10 June 2010 1 Lap (37.773 Miles) Mountain Course.

Fastest Lap and New Inaugural Lap Record:Mark Miller – 96.820 mph (23' 22.89) on lap 1.

2011 TT Zero Race
9 June 2011 1 Lap (37.73 Miles) Mountain Course.

Fastest Lap and New Race Record: Michael Rutter – 99.604 mph (22' 43.68) on lap 1.

2012 TT Zero Race
6 June 2012 1 Lap (37.73 Miles) Mountain Course.

 (9 Starters)

Fastest Lap and New Race Record: Michael Rutter – 104.056 mph (22' 23.97) on lap 1.

2013 TT Zero Race
5 June 2013 1 Lap (37.73 Miles) Mountain Course.

 (10 Starters)

Fastest Lap and New Race Record: Michael Rutter – 109.675 mph (20' 38.461) on lap 1.

2014 TT Zero Race
4 June 2014 1 Lap (37.73 Miles) Mountain Course.

 (9 Starters)

Fastest Lap and New Race Record: John McGuinness – 117.366 mph (19' 17.300) on lap 1.

2015 TT Zero Race
10 June 2015 1 Lap (37.73 Miles) Mountain Course.

 (9 Starters)

Fastest Lap and New Race Record: John McGuinness – 119.279 mph (18' 58.743) on lap 1.

2016 TT Zero Race
7 June 2016 1 Lap (37.73 Miles) Mountain Course.

 (7 Starters)

2017 TT Zero Race
9 June 2017 1 Lap (37.73 Miles) Mountain Course.

2018 TT Zero Race
6 June 2018 1 Lap (37.73 Miles) Mountain Course.

Fastest Lap and New Race Record: Michael Rutter – 121.824 mph (18' 34.956) on lap 1.

2019 TT Zero Race
6 June 2019 1 Lap (37.73 Miles) Mountain Course.

Fastest Lap and New Race Record: Michael Rutter – 121.91 mph (18' 34.172) on lap 1.

Fastest race lap by year
(practice & qualifying session laps not included)

Gallery

See also
Lightweight TT
Ultra-Lightweight TT
Sidecar TT
Junior TT
Senior TT
Electric motorsport

References

 
Electric motorcycles
Green racing